This is a list of Australian films scheduled for release in 2015.

2015

See also
 2015 in film
2015 in Australia
2015 in Australian television
List of 2015 box office number-one films in Australia

External links
 2015 Australian films, IMDb.com

References

2015
Lists of 2015 films by country or language
Films